, also known as Mei-ō, was a  after Entoku and before Bunki. This period spanned the years from  through .

Change of era
 1492 : The era name was changed to mark an event or a number of events. The old era ended and a new one commenced in Entoku 4.

Events of the Meiō era
 1492 (Meiō 1, 8th month): Shōgun Yoshimura led an army against Takayori in Ōmi Province. He laid siege to Mii-dera. Takayori saved himself by escaping in the slopes of Mount Koka. Then, Shōgun Yoshimura returned to Heian-kyō.
 1492 (Meiō 2, 1st month): The kampaku Ichijō Fuyuyoshi was named daijō-daijin.
 1492 (Meiō 2, 2nd month): Shōgun Yoshimura, accompanied by Hatakeyama Masanaga, marched against Kawachi Province, with plans to capture and put to death Hatakeyama Toshitoyo, the son of Yoshinari.
 September 12, 1495 (Meiō 4, 24th day of the 8th month): Earthquake at Kamakura, 7.1 on the Surface wave magnitude scale.
 July 9, 1498 (Meiō 7, 20th day of the 6th month): Earthquake in the Enshū-nada Sea, 6.4 .
 September 20, 1498 (Meiō 7, 2nd day of the 7th month): Earthquake in the Enshū-nada Sea, 8.3  ; and also on that same day, another earthquake in Nankaidō, 7.5 .

See also
 Historic tsunami

Notes

References
 Nussbaum, Louis Frédéric and Käthe Roth. (2005). Japan Encyclopedia. Cambridge: Harvard University Press. ; OCLC 48943301
 Titsingh, Isaac. (1834). Nihon Ōdai Ichiran; ou, Annales des empereurs du Japon. Paris: Royal Asiatic Society, Oriental Translation Fund of Great Britain and Ireland. OCLC 5850691

External links
National Diet Library, "The Japanese Calendar" -- historical overview plus illustrative images from library's collection

Japanese eras
1490s in Japan
1500s in Japan